Green Run may refer to:

Places
Green Run, Virginia, a residential and commercial community in Virginia Beach, Virginia
Green Run High School, in the above community
Green Run, Pleasants County, West Virginia, an unincorporated community in Pleasants County
Green Run (Spring Brook), a stream in Lackawanna County, Pennsylvania

Other
Green Run, a secret U.S. Government release of radioactive fission products on December 2–3, 1949
A 2021 series of tests of the SLS rocket